Yevgeni Vladimirovich Makeyev or Evgeniy Makeev (born 24 July 1989) is a Russian association football player plays as a left-back or centre-back for Veles Moscow.

Club career
He made his debut in the Russian Premier League on 15 March 2009 in a game against FC Zenit St. Petersburg.

Makeyev is able to play as a wide midfielder on either wing, but he is used mainly as a left back.

He was released from his contract with FC Rostov by mutual consent on 23 August 2018.

On 4 July 2019, he signed a one-year contract with Armenian club FC Ararat Yerevan.

International career
Makeyev was a part of the Russia U-21 side that was competing in the 2011 European Under-21 Championship qualification.

In March 2011, he was called up for the first time to the Russia national football team. He made his national team debut on 29 March 2011 in a friendly against Qatar after coming on as a half time substitute for Yuri Zhirkov. After a period when he was not called up, he played for the national team once again on 18 November 2014 in a friendly against Hungary.

Personal life
His father Vladimir Makeyev played in the Russian First League in the 1990s for FC Zhemchuzhina Sochi, FC Baltika Kaliningrad and FC Chkalovets Novosibirsk.

Career statistics

Club

References

External links
 
  Profile on the FC Spartak Moscow site
  

1989 births
People from Cherepovets
Sportspeople from Vologda Oblast
Living people
Russian footballers
Russia under-21 international footballers
Russia national football B team footballers
Russia international footballers
Association football midfielders
Association football defenders
FC Sheksna Cherepovets players
FC Spartak Moscow players
FC Spartak-2 Moscow players
FC Rostov players
FC Rotor Volgograd players
PFC Sochi players
FC Ararat Yerevan players
PFK Metallurg Bekabad players
FC Veles Moscow players
Russian Premier League players
Russian First League players
Russian Second League players
Armenian Premier League players
Uzbekistan Super League players
Russian expatriate footballers
Russian expatriate sportspeople in Armenia
Expatriate footballers in Armenia
Russian expatriate sportspeople in Uzbekistan
Expatriate footballers in Uzbekistan